John Lacy may refer to:

John Lacy (playwright) (c. 1615?–1681), an English actor and playwright
John Lacy (footballer) (born 1951), an English footballer

See also
John Lacey (disambiguation)